Aleksandr Vladislavovich Tsiberkin (born 23 March 2000) is a Russian football player.

Club career
He made his debut in the Russian Football National League for FC Dynamo Bryansk on 19 September 2020 in a game against FC Tekstilshchik Ivanovo.

References

External links
 Profile by Russian Football National League
 
 

2000 births
People from Bugulma
Sportspeople from Tatarstan
Living people
Russian footballers
Russia youth international footballers
Association football midfielders
FC Rubin Kazan players
FC Dynamo Bryansk players